Circle of Dust is the eponymous debut album by American industrial rock band Circle of Dust, released through R.E.X. Records in 1992. The 1995 reissue of Circle of Dust achieved the 25th slot on CMJ's Hard Rock 75 listings that same year.

History
All songs were written by Klayton, then known by his birth name "Scott Albert". The album was initially released through R.E.X. Records to the limited Christian music market. After R.E.X. secured mainstream distribution through Relativity Records, it was decided that a new Circle of Dust record should be put out quickly to take advantage of the increased distribution and get the band's name out there. Klayton, however, opted not to take an extended period of time to write and record a brand new album but instead re-recorded his debut album, scrapping several songs and introducing a handful of new ones. This decision was partly fueled by Klayton's intense distaste for the Circle of Dust debut:

"Technological Disguise" and "Senseless Abandon" were scrapped from the remastered version of the album. Klayton later stated in an episode of Ask Circle of Dust, that he didn't like either of them, and had no place on the remastered album. However, remasters of the songs would later be added in the 2019 compilation, Circle of Dust: Demos & Rarities.

Track listing

References

1992 debut albums
R.E.X. Records albums